The Guru is the sixth album by the rapper, PSD. It was released on July 19, 2005, for Thizz and Gateway Entertainment and was produced by PSD, Mac Dre, Dave Evans, Don Juan, Larry Funk and Jason Moss. The Guru was one of two PSD albums that Thizz Entertainment released in 2005 and was followed ua month later with PSD Classic.

Track listing
"The Guru" - 3:40
"Lay-N-Yo-Curls" - 3:49
"We..." - 4:48
"So Cool, So Cold" - 3:31 (featuring Yukmouth, Richie Rich, Mac Dre)
"The One" - 3:54
"All I Gotta Do" - 3:30
"Playground" - 3:59
"Who Dat Boy" - 3:43
"So Fine" - 4:10
"Honey Bee" - 1:08
"I Can't Love" - 4:09
"Thizzlamic" - 3:01  (featuring Cutthoat Committee)
"4-Evah My Cut" - 3:26  (featuring Monique)

2005 albums
PSD (rapper) albums
Thizz Entertainment albums